Pennsylvania Route 8 (PA 8) is a major  state route in western Pennsylvania. Officially, PA 8 is named the William Flinn Highway. Its southern terminus is at Interstate 376 (I-376)/U.S. Route 22 (US 22)/US 30 in Pittsburgh.  Its northern terminus is US 20 in Erie.

Route description

Pittsburgh to Interstate 80
The southern terminus of PA 8 is at an interchange with I-376/US 22/US 30 east of downtown Pittsburgh.  The route, running along Ardmore Boulevard, Penn Avenue and Washington Boulevard, heads west from I-376 and runs through the eastern districts of the city.  PA 8 has intersections with Pennsylvania Route 380 and Pennsylvania Route 130 prior to crossing the Allegheny River and exiting Pittsburgh.

North of the bridge that crosses the Allegheny River, PA 8 meets Pennsylvania Route 28 at an interchange.  north of Pittsburgh, PA 8 intersects Interstate 76 and the Pennsylvania Turnpike at exit 39. In Butler, PA 8 crosses Connoquenessing Creek on the General Richard Butler Bridge then runs with Pennsylvania Route 356 through downtown on South Main Street.

North of the city of Butler, PA 8 meets U.S. Route 422 at an interchange. Near Moraine State Park, PA 8 meets Pennsylvania Route 528 and Pennsylvania Route 173. In the town of Harrisville, PA 8 intersects Pennsylvania Route 58  (Grove City Harrisville Road). A few miles north of the Butler-Venango county line, PA 8 meets Interstate 80 at exit 29 near Barkeyville.

Mae West Bend
The site of numerous accidents over the years, this curve has recently been widened by razing the deteriorating buildings along the inner edge of the curve and digging out the mountainside so that two lanes ran in each direction throughout the curve (southbound travelers previously had to merge left on the curve as the right lane ended).

Interstate 80 to Erie

 north of I-80, PA 8 becomes a limited-access highway. North of the expressway, PA 8 is called Pittsburgh Road. South of Franklin, PA 8 merges with U.S. Route 62, beginning a  concurrency with the route. In Franklin, PA 8 and US 62 meet U.S. Route 322 in the city center. The routes form a short,  concurrency through the city before splitting near the Allegheny River. North of US 322, PA 8 and US 62 begin to parallel the Allegheny River. West of downtown Oil City, the concurrency with US 62 ends. US 62 crosses the Allegheny and runs south of the city before turning north towards the Allegheny National Forest and New York. PA 8, however, continues into Oil City, where PA 8 meets Pennsylvania Route 8 Business, the first of two auxiliary routes of PA 8, at Center Street. While PA 8 Business heads into Oil City, PA 8 runs west of the city along the former routing of Pennsylvania Route 8 Bypass, rejoining PA 8 Business at North Seneca Street north of town.

North of Oil City, PA 8 is named Oil City-Titusville Road. In the city of Titusville, PA 8 meets Pennsylvania Route 27 and the southern terminus of Pennsylvania Route 89 at the intersection of Franklin Street and Central Avenue. PA 8 forms a concurrency with PA 27 westward along the one-way streets of Central Avenue and Diamond Street before splitting at Spring Street.

In Riceville, PA 8 intersects Pennsylvania Route 77.  north of PA 77, PA 8 enters Erie County. In Union City, PA 8 merges with U.S. Route 6 for  through downtown. Just north of the split with US 6, PA 8 meets the southern terminus of the northern segment of Pennsylvania Route 97. PA 8 passes by a dry lake called Union City Lake south of Wattsburg, where it merges with Pennsylvania Route 89. The two routes run concurrent to one another through Wattsburg, where PA 8 and PA 89 meet the western terminus of Pennsylvania Route 474, to the Venango Township community of Lowville, where PA 8 breaks from PA 89, taking a more westerly routing than PA 89. PA 8 is named Wattsburg Road between Lowville and the Erie city line.

 southeast of Erie, PA 8 interchanges with Interstate 90 at exit 29, which shows a sign for Parade Street (northbound) and Hammett (southbound).

PA 97 and PA 8 effectively join to become Parade Street, which continues north to Front Street, just south of the Bayfront Parkway.

History
PA 8 was first signed in 1926 from West Virginia to Erie.  South of Pittsburgh, PA 8 followed the current U.S. Route 19 alignment from the West Virginia state line to Canonsburg, as well as the present Pennsylvania Route 50 alignment from Bridgeville to Crafton. The West Virginia – Pittsburgh segment was decommissioned in 1930.

In 1934, construction began on PA 8 between the Allegheny–Butler county line and Three Degree Road. This segment opened in 1935. Later, in 1958, construction commenced on the segment from Grant Avenue to Pennsylvania Route 28 in Etna.  In that same year, the route was widened and a median was installed from Franklin to Reno. The Grant Avenue – PA 28 segment was completed the following year.  In 1961, PA 8 from the end of the Richard C. Frame Memorial Highway at Interstate 80 to Franklin was upgraded with a median, and, in 1968, the section from Reno to Oil City had a median installed as well.

In 1973, construction began on the section of expressway from Pennsylvania Route 308 in Pearl to the northern end of the present expressway south of Franklin in Venango County. That same year, the southern terminus of PA 8 was moved from West Carson Street in Pittsburgh to Pennsylvania Route 28 in Etna. In 1974, construction began on the remainder of the expressway from the present southern end at Wesley to PA 308. The highway was completed in 1976.  In 1977, the southern terminus was moved to its current location from PA 28 in Etna.  In 1979, the route was realigned onto what was then PA 8 Bypass (Main Street) to bypass downtown Oil City.  PA 8 Bypass, initially signed in 1941, was decommissioned while the former routing in PA 8 in Oil City became Pennsylvania Route 8 Business.

Major intersections

Special routes

PA 8 Business

Pennsylvania Route 8 Business is a  business route in Venango County, Pennsylvania.

In 1979, a two-lane but development-free bypass of Oil City was constructed on the westbank of Oil Creek and featured the designation of Pennsylvania Route 8 Bypass. The original eastbank sector and its two bridges were initially kept as mainline Route 8. The first half of the very short route features one-way couples through the heart of the municipality, and the northern half features a single, business-lined two-lane street.  Mainline Route 8 was redirected to the former bypass upon the commissioning of Route 8 Business.

PA 8 Truck

Pennsylvania Route 8 Truck is a  truck route in Titusville, Crawford County, Pennsylvania. In 1980, the designation was established to remove trucks from the complicated intersection with Pennsylvania Route 27 and to provide direct access for local trucks past the borough's small industrial area along St. John Street. For its entire length it is cosigned with Truck Route 27.

PA 8 Alternate Truck

Pennsylvania Route 8 Alternate Truck is a truck route around a weight-restricted bridge over the East Branch of the Oil Creek, on which trucks over 32 tons and combination loads over 40 tons are prohibited.  The route follows PA 408 and PA 77 and was signed in 2013.

PA 8 Bypass

Pennsylvania Route 8 Bypass was the original designation for PA 8 Business.  PA 8 Bypass was signed in 1979, but was decommissioned and renamed PA 8 Business in 2000.

See also

References

External links

Pennsylvania Highways: PA 8

008
Limited-access roads in Pennsylvania
Transportation in Allegheny County, Pennsylvania
Transportation in Butler County, Pennsylvania
Transportation in Venango County, Pennsylvania
Transportation in Crawford County, Pennsylvania
Transportation in Erie County, Pennsylvania
U.S. Route 19